The South African National Defence Force (SANDF) comprises the armed forces of South Africa. The commander of the SANDF is appointed by the President of South Africa from one of the armed services. They are in turn accountable to the Minister of Defence and Military Veterans of the Defence Department.

The military as it exists today was created in 1994, following South Africa's first nonracial election in April of that year and the adoption of a new constitution. It replaced the South African Defence Force and also integrated uMkhonto we Sizwe (MK), and the Azanian People's Liberation Army (APLA) guerilla forces.

History

Integration process
In 1994, the SANDF took over the personnel and equipment from the SADF and integrated forces from the former Bantustan homelands forces, as well as personnel from the former guerrilla forces of some of the political parties involved in South Africa, such as the African National Congress's Umkhonto we Sizwe, the Pan Africanist Congress's Azanian People's Liberation Army and the Self-Protection Units of the Inkatha Freedom Party (IFP). The Azanian People's Organization' s AZANLA was invited but refused to be integrated and to this day remains the only guerrilla force not integrated into the current force.

As of 2004, the integration process was considered complete, with retaining personnel, structure, and equipment from the SADF. However, due to integration problems, financial constraints, and other issues, the SANDF faced capability constraints.

The South African Commando System was a civil militia active until 2008, based upon local units from the size of company to battalion. In its final years its role was to support the South African Police Service during internal operations. During such deployments the units came under SAPS control.

1999 re-armament

In 1999, a R30 billion (US$4.8 billion) purchase of weaponry by the South African Government was finalised, which has been subject to allegations of corruption. The South African Department of Defence's Strategic Defence Acquisition purchased frigates, submarines, light utility helicopters, lead-in fighter trainer and multirole combat aircraft.

Decline
Systemic public-sector corruption, State capture, (2011/12 to 2017) had a debilitating effect on Denel and consequently the country's defence capability. In 2014 some 62% of the SANDF's facilities and housing were deemed to be in unacceptable condition, of which 4% were hazardous, another 2% fit to be demolished, and some occupied by squatters. This contributed to low soldier morale and poor discipline. Equipment became largely obsolete due to inadequate maintenance, while renewal stalled with devastating effect on the defence industry. According to the Department of Defence's 2014 Defence Review, the SANDF was "in a critical state of decline". A series of cuts to its capital and operating budgets compromised a number of capabilities. 

In 2017 and 2021 respectively, 83 and some 200 to 500 out-of-service military vehicles were destroyed in fires at the Wallmansthal vehicle depot, and a spokesperson was not available to liaise with the press. Notwithstanding, it was reported to parliament in 2022, that technical skills gained from personnel of the Cuban RAF facilitated the preservation and maintenance of over 600,000 infantry weapons. Their mechanical and vehicular skills allowed for the inspection, repair, refurbishment and/or de-activation of vehicles in the special forces and the four arms of service fleets, besides the implementation of stock control and technical support measures, and the rehabilitation of army workshops and work stations.

After submissions to parliament by Armscor, earlier in 2022, a spokesman for the official opposition, the DA, stated that the country's defence capability had been weakened to the extent that it was unprepared for a serious security challenge. The Navy and Air Force were highlighted as easy targets, as only one of the four frigates were serviceable, and none of the submarines, while only 46 of 217 fixed-wing aircraft were serviceable (with all VIP aircraft grounded), and only 27 of 87 helicopters. Budget and hardware constraints also compromised flight training and exercises, besides the retention of experienced pilots and personnel. The defence minister's appointment of an Air Force chief, Wiseman Mbambo, who cannot fly a plane and doesn't have a pilot's licence was also criticized. The SANDF had only 14 infantry battalions consisting of 12,000 soldiers in aggregate, of which five were deployed in peacekeeping and border patrol, leaving only nine to serve as home or rapid response units. 

In February 2022 the power supply to its Navy headquarters in Pretoria was disconnected when its municipal taxes were in arrears to the amount of R3.2 million. During the same month Sandu threatened legal action if the dilapidated Air Force headquarters building in Pretoria were not repaired to facilitate acceptable working conditions. In March 2022 the SANDF and Navy were locked out of several office buildings in Pretoria due to rent defaults by the Department of Public Works. 63% of the 2022/23 defence budget was allocated to employee compensation.

In 2022 the SANDF was involved in multiple corruption scandals totaling R2 billion; one of which involved 56 SANDF personnel two of whom were generals all of whom were suspended. An additional 13 SANDF personal from the Logistics, Joint Operations and Special Forces divisions were convicted for corruption in another incident.

Domestic operations

, the SANDF was involved in several internal operations, including:
 Safeguarding the border (Operation CORONA)
 Disaster relief and assistance (Operation CHARIOT) 
 Safety and security (Operation PROSPER)
 Ridding the country of illegal weapons, drug dens, prostitution rings and other illegal activities (Operation FIELA)

In 2021, SANDF forces were deployed in response to the civil unrest following the jailing on corruption charges of former president Jacob Zuma. By 14 July, over 25,000 troops had been deployed. The largest single deployment of the South African National Defence Force since 1994.

International operations
The SANDF partakes in UN peacekeeping missions, mostly on the African continent. As part of the SADC standby force it partakes in peace missions in the DRC and northern Mozambique. It also provides foreign election security when needed.

Organisation and structure
Overall command is vested in an officer-designated Chief of the SANDF (CSANDF). Appointed from any of the Arms of Service, they are the only person in the SANDF at the rank of General or Admiral, and is accountable to the Minister of Defence and Veteran Affairs, who heads the Department of Defence

The structure of the SANDF is depicted below:

In 2010, a Defence Amendment Bill created a permanent National Defence Force Service Commission (NDFSC), a body that will advise the Minister of Defence and Military Veterans on the improvement of conditions of service of members of the South African National Defence Force (SANDF).

Members of the Commission include the Chiefs of the service arms, as well as the Chief of Defence Intelligence as well as the Chief of Joint Operations

Four armed services make up the forces of the SANDF:
 South African Army
 South African Air Force
 South African Navy
 South African Military Health Service

The Joint Operations Division is responsible for co-ordinating all Joint Operations involving any or all of the four services. The South African Special Forces Brigade is the only organic unit under the direct command of the Joint Operations division. Unlike most other special forces it is not part of the Army or any other branch of the SANDF.

Publications and access to records
The SANDF  publishes (or provides links) to documents describing its strategy, plans, performance, white papers and related government acts. Under the Promotion of Access to Information Act 2000 (PAIA), the SANDF also provides  access to current and historical information the SANDF holds and provides a manual with procedures for obtaining access. Some categories of records are "automatically available" that are "available without a person having to request access in terms of the PAIA. These records can be accessed at the Department of Defence Archives and include operational records of the 1st World War, 2nd World War, Korean War, and establishment of the Union Defence Force 1912.

Military equipment and industry

Military equipment 

The SANDF possesses various foreign and domestically produced weapons. Most of its equipment comes from its own domestic military industry and some gear comes from foreign countries.

Military industry 

South Africa's arms industry dates back in 1968 and was established primarily as a response to the international sanctions by the United Nations against South Africa due to apartheid, which began in 1963 and prevented the country from acquiring foreign combat systems until 1990. South Africa's arms industry is the only arms industry in Africa capable of producing home-grown sophisticated military equipment, as of today it is considered one of the most advanced in the non-Western world rivalling great nations such as the USA, Russia, China and the European Union. The wide-ranging locally-made South African weapons and combat systems include Transport and Attack helicopters, Armoured personnel carriers, Main battle tanks, Missiles, Cruise missiles, Unmanned aeriel vehicle's, Military aircraft, infantry equipment and ships. Although the South African defence budget has been shrinking over the years and is now less than 1% of GDP against the international average of 2%, the military industry is largely exporting to survive and continues to develop world class military hardware. In 2021 The South African military industry exported R3.3 billion worth of weapons, ammunition and military equipment to 67 countries around the world.

Future acquisitions

Project Hoefyster 

Project Hoefyster was launched in 2013 to partially replace the South African Army's ageing Ratel fleet with around 240 new generation Badger infantry fighting vehicles in a number of different variants over the next decade. A contract was placed with Denel Land Systems in 2013 for service entry by 2022.

The Badger is being produced in nine different variants including a mortar variant, missile variant, section variant, signal variant, ambulance variant, command variant, fire support variant, and artillery variant. The section and fire support variants will be equipped with the 30 mm (30×173 mm) GI-30 cannon locally developed by Denel Land Systems. 

Deliveries were scheduled between 2019 and 2022 but problems at Denel have caused delay's with no vehicles delivered to the South African Army, Armscor has recommended cancelling the contract and the funds to be spent on Ratel upgrades instead. Paramount Group believes a better alternative is to supply its Mbombe 8 infantry fighting vehicles to the South African Army which is a similar vehicle to the Badger as an immediately available and alternative to the long-delayed Badger vehicle. In Armed Forces Day 2023 South Africa an unknown number of Badger IFVs was seen in service with the South African Army.

Projects Sepula and Vistula 
The South African Army has deferred the acquisition of trucks and armoured vehicles to replace its Samil and Casspir fleets under Projects Sepula and Vistula as it explores domestic refurbishment and production. Project Vistula aimed to replace the Samil 50/100 4×4/6×6 truck fleet and Project Sepula aimed to replace the Casspir and Mamba armoured personnel carrier fleets of the South African Army.

Projects Biro and Hotel 

Project Biro will supply three new Warrior-class Multirole Inshore Patrols Vessels (MMIPVS) to the South African Navy to take over and replace the maritime coastal patrol function currently executed by the obsolete Offshore Patrol Vessels (OPVs) SAS Isaac Dyobha and SAS Makhanda.

The second future acquisition project for the SA Navy falls under Project Hotel, Project Hotel was initiated to replace the ageing SAS Protea, the SA Navy’s current hydrographic vessel which is more than 50 years old. The delivery of the South African Navy’s new Hydrographic Survey Vessel under Project Hotel has been delayed due to the Covid-19 pandemic and the 2021 South African unrest, the vessel is expected to be delivered sometime between the end of 2023 or early 2024. The vessel will be equipped with the latest survey equipment which includes multi- and single beam echo-sounders as well as side-scan sonar and a seabed sampler to recover material from the seafloor and underlying sub-strata for detailed analytical and testing purposes.

Other future acquisitions 
The South African Air Force's top priority is to acquire new strategic airlift aircraft to replace its ageing C-130BZ Hercules. The SAAF is deciding whether to upgrade its C-130BZ Hercules fleet or accept retired C-130Hs from the United States which would also need to be upgraded. The United Kingdom had offered to sell South Africa surplus C-130J Super Hercules while the US was offering excess C-130Hs.

Foreign military relations

Brazil 
Brazil-South Africa military relations have traditionally been close, in 2022 the Brazilian Armed Forces provided military assistance to the SANDF in the form of warfare training and logistics. Brazil and South Africa also collaborated on the A-Darter air-to-air missile project which will be used on both their JAS 39 Gripen fighter jets. Both countries are looking to further cooperate in missile development, notably on the 100 km range Marlin radar-guided air-to-air weapon which will feature a radar seeker head and will be developed into an all-weather surface-to-air missile (SAM) that can be used by South African and Brazilian Navies, In addition South Africa is also looking at collaborating with Brazil on a high speed target drone and a vertical takeoff and landing unmanned aerial vehicle (VTOL UAV). Both countries are part of the IBSA Dialogue Forum.

India 
India and South Africa have also developed military cooperation, trading arms and joint exercises like IBSAMAR, which started in 2008 between India, Brazil, and South Africa and programs to train forces. During the 1990s South Africa developed the Bhim self-propelled howitzer to meet the Indian Army's requirements for self-propelled artillery units. South Africa is looking at collaboration with Indian defence companies after a trade visit identified areas of cooperation that include ammunition, landward weapons, particularly artillery, cybersecurity, electronic warfare, unmanned aerial vehicles, robotics and artificial intelligence. Both countries are part of the IBSA Dialogue Forum.

Personnel 

On 31 March 2019, the demographics of service personnel were as follows:
 55,866 (75%) Black
 8,479 (11.4%) White
 981 (1.3%) Indian
 9,162 (12.3%) Coloureds

The gender split in the SANDF as of 31 March 2019 is as follows:
51,684 men (69.4%)
22,824 women (30.6%)

The target for female recruits increased to 40% in 2010.

Gallery

2012 Defence Review

The South African Defence Review 2012 is a policy review process carried out by a panel of experts, chaired by retired politician and former Minister of Defence, Roelf Meyer. The review was commissioned by Lindiwe Sisulu the then Minister of Defence and Military Veterans, in July 2011. The review was motivated by the need to correct the errors and shortcomings of the previous review. According to defence minister Lindiwe Sisulu, the old report was no longer relevant to South Africa's current situation.

See also

 List of South African military chiefs
 List of South African military bases
 Military history of South Africa
South African military decorations
 2019 renaming of South African National Defence Force reserve units

References

Further reading
 
 https://www.defenceweb.co.za/sa-defence/sa-defence-sa-defence/landward-force-makes-up-over-half-of-sandf-strength/ - SANDF strength numbers 2014/15

External links

  South African Department of Defence
 Defence Act (Act 42 of 2002)

 
Military units and formations established in 1994